Matthew Dunn (born 1973) is a former Olympic freestyle and medley swimmer.

Matthew or Matt Dunn may also refer to:

 Matthew Dunn (author) (born 1968), British novelist
 Matt Dunn (cricketer) (born 1992), English cricketer
 Matt Dunn (author) (born 1966), British romantic comedy novelist
 Matt Dunn (soccer) (born 1994), American soccer player
 Matthew A. Dunn (1886–1942), Democratic member of the U.S. House of Representatives from Pennsylvania

See also
Matt Dunne (born 1969), American politician
Matt Done (born 1988), English footballer